K-571 Krasnoyarsk is a  nuclear-powered cruise missile submarine of the Russian Navy. It is the third boat of the project Yasen-M. Considerable changes were made to the initial Yasen design. Differences in the project have appeared sufficient to consider it as a new upgraded version Yasen-M. The submarine is named after the city of Krasnoyarsk.

Design 
The submarine project was developed in the Malachite Design Bureau in Saint Petersburg.

Compared to the first-of-class Severodvinsk, Kazan, Novosibirsk and Krasnoyarsk are some  shorter, resulting in the deletion of a sonar array from the former's bow. According to one naval analyst, the intention was likely to reduce construction costs without meaningfully reducing the submarine's capabilities. Krasnoyarsk will also include a nuclear reactor with a newly designed cooling system.

History 

On 30 July 2021, Krasnoyarsk was rolled out of the construction hall and subsequently launched on the water. The submarine's future commander Captain 2nd Rank Ivan Artyushin traditionally smashed a bottle against the ship's board. In February 2022, Krasnoyarsk started the mooring trials. Sea trials started on 26 June. The submarine is expected to be commissioned in 2023.

References 

Yasen-class submarines
Ships built by Sevmash
2021 ships